Agbande is a village in the Doufelgou Prefecture in the Kara Region of north-eastern Togo.

There is also another village in the Prefecture which have the same name. This is located at:
Agbande

References

Populated places in Kara Region
Doufelgou Prefecture